{{DISPLAYTITLE:C30H26O12}}
The molecular formula C30H26O12 may refer to:

Several B type proanthocyanidins dimers:
 Procyanidin B1 or epicatechin-(4β→8)-catechin
 Procyanidin B2 or (-)-epicatechin-(4β→8)-(-)-epicatechin
 Procyanidin B3 or catechin-(4β→8)-catechin
 Procyanidin B4 or catechin-(4α→8)-epicatechin
 Procyanidin B5 or epicatechin-(4β→6)-epicatechin
 Procyanidin B6 or catechin-(4α→6)-catechin
 Procyanidin B8 catechin-(4α→6)-epicatechin